NPS may refer to:

Organizations 
 National Park Service, U.S.
 National Pension System, India
 National Pension Service, Korea
 National Phobics Society, UK charity
 National Piers Society, UK charity
 National Poetry Slam, competition 
 National Probation Service, a statutory criminal justice service for England and Wales
 Nederlandse Programma Stichting, a Dutch broadcasting foundation now part of Omroep NTR
 Nigerian Prisons Services
 NPS MedicineWise, known prior to 2009 as the National Prescribing Service, a medical information provider in Australia
 Nunavik Police Service in Quebec, Canada

Science, medicine and pharmaceutics 
 Nail–patella syndrome, an autosomal dominant genetic disorder
 Neuropeptide S, a neuropeptide found in human and mammalian brain
 New psychoactive substance
 Nonpoint source pollution
 NPS Pharmaceuticals, acquired by Shire in 2015

Technology 
 Network Policy Server, component of Microsoft Server 2008

Pipes and pipe threads 
 National pipe straight, a non-taper pipe thread among the national pipe thread standards
 Nominal Pipe Size, a North American set of standard sizes for pipes

Politics 
 National Party of Scotland,  1928–1934 
 National Party of Suriname
 New Socialist Party (France) 
 New Socialist Party (San Marino) 

Education 
 National Public School, Indiranagar, Bangalore, India
 Naval Postgraduate School, California, US

Literature 
 New Penguin Shakespeare, a series of the works of Shakespeare published by Penguin Books

Business 
 Net promoter score, in customer relations